The Italian Hockey League - Division I (former Serie C) is the third level of ice hockey in Italy. It is below the Italian Hockey League - Serie A and the Italian Hockey League.

External links
 League on eurohockey.com

3
Sports leagues established in 2004
2004 establishments in Italy
Ita